General Erhard Bühler (born 20 January 1956) is a retired officer of the German Army, and the former Director General for Planning German Ministry of Defence in Berlin, Germany. He was the commander of KFOR, from September 2010 to September 2011. He led approximately 5000 troops, although the number declined during his tenure as the security situation in Kosovo improved. In 2004, Bühler had led the Bundeswehr contingent of KFOR in Prizren. Bühler commanded Allied Joint Force Command Brunssum from 31 March 2019 to 22 April 2020.

Personal life
Buhler was born in Aichach, Bavaria and grew up in Regensburg. He is married and has a son.

References

External links

 

Major generals of the German Army
Living people
1956 births
People from Aichach
Military personnel from Bavaria